Verviers is a city and municipality of Wallonia located in the province of Liège, Belgium.

The municipality consists of the following districts: Ensival, Heusy, Lambermont, Petit-Rechain, Stembert, and Verviers. It is also the center of an agglomeration that includes Dison and Pepinster, making it the second biggest in the province and an important regional center, located roughly halfway between Liège and the German border.

Water has played an important role in the town's economy, notably in the development first of its textile and later its tourist industries. As a result, many fountains have been built in Verviers, leading it to be named Wallonia's "Water Capital". The seats of the two Walloon public institutions for water distribution and water treatment are located in the town.

History

Early history 
Various flint and bone fragments, as well as Roman coins, were found in this area, attesting to the early settlements in the region.  In the 4th century, the Romans had to deal with a constant push of Germanic tribes coming from the east.  Successful at first at containing them, they finally had to concede defeat, allowing Clovis's Salian Franks to occupy the region at the end of the 5th century.  The Verviers area was covered with forests and became a hunting ground for the Merovingian kings, who maintained a vicus in neighbouring Theux.  It was also slowly Christianized by the monks of the nearby Abbey of Stavelot.

Late in the 10th century, Charles the Simple ceded the Marquisate of Franchimont to Notker of Liège, one of Notker's final steps in consolidating the Prince-Bishopric of Liège.  Liège took direct control of the marquisate in 1014, an act which was confirmed by emperor Frederick Barbarossa and by Pope Adrian IV in 1155.

15th century to the present 

The first mention of a textile industry in this area dates from the 15th century. One century later, the cloth industry took the place of the older metallurgical works, thanks in part to the Eighty Years War raging in the neighbouring Netherlands. The size of the town, however, remained relatively modest.  It was only in 1651 that the expansion of the fulleries led to Verviers being recognized as one of the prince-bishopric's bonnes villes (main cities).

The end of the 18th century was troubled by the French Revolution. The annexation of Liège to France in 1795 caused a steep economic decline and unprecedented poverty. The city's fortunes rose again after the Battle of Waterloo (1815). Verviers was at the eastern end of the sillon industriel, the industrial backbone of Wallonia. Industrialist William Cockerill used British know-how to start a new era in Verviers' textile industry.  Roads were paved, gas lighting was installed, and the city doubled in size thanks to the Industrial Revolution. After World War I, Verviers could share with Bradford the title of "Wool Capital of the World".

Economy 
Verviers was home to a thriving wool and textile industry that was renowned for its quality and contributed greatly to the growth of the town. However, as of the 1950s, the local factories could not face international competition and started closing one after the other which prompted the economic decline of the town. The economy has been slowly recovering since the mid-1990s but remains fragile. Several commercial complexes have opened in recent years in an attempt to revitalize the most affected areas.

Sights 

Verviers counts several museums, including the Wool and Fashion Tourist Centre, housed in a former factory with a Neoclassical-style façade.
The Grand Theatre, also known as La Bonbonnière, was built in the same style at the end of the 19th century, while the Grand Poste was built in the Neogothic style.
The city has a number of interesting fountains and thematic strolling paths.

Notable people 
Jean-Jacques Andrien, film maker (1944)
Bertrand Baguette, racing driver (born 1986)
Christian Beck, writer and poet (1879–1916)
André Blavier, poet and critic (1922–2001)
William Cockerill, industrialist, settled in Verviers in 1799
Mathieu Crickboom, violinist (1871–1947)
Pierre David, twice mayor of Verviers (1771-1839)
Brandon Deville, football player (born 1993)
Jacques Drèze, economist (born 1929)
Albert Dupuis, composer (1877–1967)
Emile Fabry
Philippe Gilbert, road racing cyclist (born 1982)
Green Montana, rapper (born 1993)
René Hausman, comic strip scenarist (1936-2016)
Jean Haust, linguist and philologist (1868–1946)
Steve Houben, jazz saxophonist and flutist (born 1950)
Karima, writer (born 1976)
Jean-Marie Klinkenberg, linguist (born 1944)
Marc Lacroix, breast cancer researcher (born 1963)
Guillaume Lekeu, composer (1870–1894)
Roger Leloup, comic strip scenarist (born 1933)
Raymond Macherot, cartoonist (1924–2008)
Maurane, singer (1960–2018)
Philippe Maystadt, politician (1948-2017)
Dominique Monami, tennis player (born 1973)
David Murgia, actor (born 1988)
Nornagest, musician and writer (born 1977)
Henri Pirenne, historian (1862–1935)
Pierre Rapsat, singer (1948–2002)
Eliane Reyes, pianist (born 1977)
Georges Ruggiu, radio presenter during the 1994 Rwandan genocide (born 1957)
Albert Sambi Lokonga, footballer (born 1999)
Lucy Sante, writer and critic (born 1954)
Céline Scheen, classical soprano (born 1976)
Jacques Stotzem, fingerstyle guitarist (born 1959)
Jean Vallée, singer (1941–2013)
Eric van de Poele, Formula One driver (born 1961)
Henri Vieuxtemps, composer and virtuoso violinist (1820–1881)
Violetta Villas, singer (1938–2011)
Charles Weerts, racing driver (born 2001)
Yvan Ylieff, politician (born 1941)

Education

Tertiary education
Tertiary educational institutions include:
 Haute Ecole de la Province de Liège (Construction)
 Haute Ecole de la Province de Liège - Bachelier en soins infirmiers
 Haute Ecole CHarlemagne Verviers
 HELMO Verviers

Primary and secondary schools
Secondary schools include:
 Athénée royal Thil Lorrain Verviers 1
 Athénée royal Verdi
 Centre scolaire Saint-François-Xavier
 Ecole Polytechnique - Enseignement de la Province de Liège
 Institut Notre Dame
 Institut Provincial d'Enseignement Secondaire (IPES)
 Institut Provincial d'Enseignement Secondaire Paramédical de Liège - Huy - Verviers
 Institut Sainte-Claire
Institut Saint-François-Xavier 2
 Institut Saint-Michel
 Institut Technique Don Bosco

Twin cities 
: Arles
: Mönchengladbach
: Roubaix
: Bradford
: La Motte-Chalancon

Gallery

See also 
 List of protected heritage sites in Verviers
 2015 anti-terrorism operations in Belgium

References

External links 

Official web site (in French)
 Alternative Facebook site (in French)

 
Cities in Wallonia
Municipalities of Liège Province